Bernard Donovan (born 12 July 1995) is a Zimbabwean international footballer who plays for How Mine as a goalkeeper.

Career
Donovan has played for Motor Action and How Mine.

He made his international debut in 2014, and was named in the squad for the 2017 Africa Cup of Nations.

References

1995 births
Living people
Zimbabwean footballers
Zimbabwe international footballers
Motor Action F.C. players
How Mine F.C. players
Association football goalkeepers
2017 Africa Cup of Nations players
Zimbabwe A' international footballers
2016 African Nations Championship players